Pia Fidelis, Latin feminine form for "pious and faithful", was the cognomen of several Roman legions, awarded by an emperor when the legion had proved "devoted and loyal". Some legions received this honour several times, and their name included the number of awards.

 Legio I Adiutrix Pia Fidelis Bis ("twice loyal and faithful") 
 I Minervia Pia Fidelis Domitiana ("loyal and faithful to Domitian")
 II Adiutrix
 III Italica VII Pia VII Fidelis ("seven times faithful and loyal")
 V Macedonica VII Pia VII Fidelis
 VII Claudia VII Pia VII Fidelis ("seven times faithful and loyal")
 X Gemina Pia Fidelis Domitiana ("faithful and loyal to Domitian")
 XI Claudia Pia VI Fidelis VI ("six times faithful and loyal")

Roman legions